Spex Design Corporation was a kit car manufacturer based in Montreal, Quebec, Canada. The company was founded by Paul Deutchman (also known for the T-Rex, Porsche Spexter and Callaway cars like the C7 Corvette and CS Camaro) and Kell Warshaw in 1985. The company made a kit called Spex Elf that was somewhere in the middle of a body kit and a kit car based on the first generation (1973-1979) Honda Civic. By cutting off the roof and side panels and adding a steel subframe and fibreglass body it allowed a quite easy conversion of a Honda Civic into a roadster. The kit used many parts from the donor Civic, but the front light came from the Honda Accord and the rear light from Mercury Capri. The company made about 20 kits before selling the molds.

Kit car manufacturers